Mfanafuthi Prince Nxumalo (born 18 May 1990) is a South African professional soccer player who plays for Sekhukhune United as a forward.

Club career
Nxumalo joined SuperSport United from FC Cape Town in August 2012. He made his league debut against Ajax Cape Town on 19 December 2012, scoring a goal. Prince Nxumalo has since moved to Lamontville Goldern Arrows on loan in January 2015.

References

External links

1990 births
Living people
South African soccer players
Association football forwards
Sportspeople from Durban
South African Premier Division players
National First Division players
SuperSport United F.C. players
F.C. Cape Town players
Lamontville Golden Arrows F.C. players
Cape Town Spurs F.C. players
Bidvest Wits F.C. players
Baroka F.C. players
Sekhukhune United F.C. players